Camili may refer to the following places in Turkey:

 Camili, Ağaçören, a village in the district of Ağaçören, Aksaray Province
 Camili, Borçka, a village in the district of Borçka, Artvin Province
 Camili, Döşemealtı, a village in the district of Antalya, Antalya Province
 Camili, Emirdağ, a village in the district of Emirdağ, Afyonkarahisar Province
 Camili, Mersin, a village in the district of Akdeniz, Mersin Province
 Camili, Yüreğir, a village in the district of Yüreğir, Adana Province
 Camili, Çubuk, a village in the district of Çubuk, Ankara Province
 Camili, İmamoğlu, a village in the district of İmamoğlu, Adana Province